Solitary Confinement is the second and final studio album by British hip hop group, Rhyme Asylum. The guests included Crooked I, Ill Bill, DarkStar and Rhyme Asylum longtime collaborator Reain aKa Whasisface.

Track listing
Solitary Confinement (4:32)
For the Hate (4:38)
This is Where (3:42)
Divine Right of Kings (3:51)
Next Level (4:05)
Event Horizon (feat. Crooked I) (5:13)
Axe of Violence (2:39)
I Know (5:30)
Strange Deranged (feat. Reain) (3:34)
The 'N' Word (2:05)
The Art of Raw (3:41)
Returmination (3:58)
Who Goes There (4:11)
Don't Wanna Be (4:02)
Straight Jacket Immortals (3:45)
Broken Window (4:59)
Open Mic Surgery (feat. DarkStar and Ill Bill) (4:14)
Life Support (3:51)

Production 
Tracks 1 & 11 Produced By: Think
Track 4 Produced By: Crate Creeps
Tracks 5 & 9 Produced By: Al'Tarba
Tracks 4 Produced By: DJ Butcher
Track 7 Produced By: Profound Beats
Track 12 Produced By: The Returners
Track 14 Produced By: Hirolla
Track 15 Produced By: Chemo
Track 18 Produced By: Ill Fated
Tracks 2, 3, 6, 8, 10, 13, 16 & 17 Produced By: Engineer

Credits 
Arranged By: Psiklone & Chemo
Cuts by: Psiklone
Recorded, Mixed and Mastered By: Chemo @ Kilamanjaro Studios
Photography by: RomanyWG
Graphic Design by: Psiklone

References

2010 albums